Mazaeras is a genus of moths in the family Erebidae. The genus was erected by Francis Walker in 1855.

Species
Mazaeras conferta Walker, 1855
Mazaeras francki Schaus, 1896
Mazaeras janeira (Schaus, 1892)
Mazaeras macasia (Schaus, 1924)
Mazaeras magnifica (Rothschild, 1909)
Mazaeras mediofasciata (Joicey & Talbot, 1916)
Mazaeras melanopyga (Walker, 1869)
Mazaeras soteria Druce, 1900

References

External links

Phaegopterina
Moth genera